Dongsi (lit. "Eastern Four" or "Eastern Quadrangle") is the name of an intersection and surrounding neighborhood in Dongcheng District, Beijing. Dongsi, at the intersection of what is now Dongsi Avenues North, South and West and Chaoyangmen Inner Street, dates to the Yuan dynasty.  The intersection is named after four paifangs or Chinese sign gates that marked the location and is known in Chinese as the Eastern Four Sign Gates or "Eastern Four" for short.  Directly due west in Xicheng District, another intersection with four sign gates is called Xisi or the "Western Four".

The sign gates at Dongsi and Xisi were removed in 1958 but the location names remain. Today, the Dongsi Station on Lines 5 and 6 of the Beijing Subway is located underneath the intersection.  Beijing Bus 106, 110, 116, 684, and 夜10 stop south of the intersection.  Bus 58, 101, 109, 112, 420, and 夜13 stop east of the intersection. 
Dongsi is known for the Longfusi Snack Street where traditional restaurants such as Baikuilaohao serve Beijing snack cuisine.  The Dongsi Mosque, founded in 1356 and rebuilt in 1447, is located just south of the intersection.

History

Dongsi Subdistrict
The neighborhood northeast of Dongsi, extending north to Dongsi Shitiao and east to the Second Ring Road, is administered as the Dongsi Subdistrict of Dongcheng District.

In 2021, the subdistrict was divided into the 6 following communities:

Dongsi's numbered alleyways
Running east-west through the Dongsi Subdistrict are a series of parallel alleyways called tiao.  These hutongs are numbered in ascending order from south to north beginning with Dongsi Toutiao, the first alleyway of Dongsi, up to Dongsi Shisitiao or the fourteenth alleyway of Dongsi.  The tenth alleyway, Dongsi Shitiao, was extended eastward through an opening in the Beijing city wall and was widened in the 1990s to become one of the main east–west thoroughfares in the old city.  The Dongsi Shitiao Station on Subway Line 2 marks the intersection of the alleyway and the wall.

See also

Xisi
Dongdan
Xidan

References

Road transport in Beijing
Neighbourhoods of Beijing
Dongcheng District, Beijing
Subdistricts of Beijing